Anicla is a genus of moths of the family Noctuidae.

Species
Subgenus Anicla
 Anicla cemolia Franclemont, 1967
 Anicla ignicans (Guenée, 1852)
 Anicla infecta (Ochsenheimer, 1816)
 Anicla ornea (Druce, 1889)
Subgenus Euagrotis (formerly a separate genus)
 Anicla bairdii (J.B. Smith, 1908)
 Anicla beata (Grote, 1883)
 Anicla digna (Morrison, 1875)
 Anicla exuberans (J. B. Smith, 1898)
 Anicla forbesi (Franclemont, 1952)
 Anicla illapsa (Walker, 1857)
 Anicla lubricans (Guenée, 1852)
 Anicla simplicia (Morrison, 1875)
 Anicla tenuescens (Smith, 1890)
 Anicla tepperi (Smith, 1888)
Subgenus unknown
 Anicla biformata Lafontaine, 2004
 Anicla espoetia (Dyar, 1910)
 Anicla mus Lafontaine, 2004
 Anicla sullivani Lafontaine, 2004

References
 Anicla at Markku Savela's Lepidoptera and Some Other Life Forms
 Natural History Museum Lepidoptera genus database

Noctuinae
Noctuoidea genera